Nifas Silk-Lafto, also spelled Niffassilk Lafto or Nefassilk Lafto (Amharic: ንፋስ ስልክ ላፍቶ ክፍለ ከተማ), is a district of Addis Ababa, Ethiopia. As of 2011 its population was of 335,740.

Geography
The district is located in the southwestern suburb of the city. It borders with the districts of Kolfe Keranio, Lideta, Kirkos and Bole and Akaky Kaliti.

List of places
 Jemo Michael
 Jemo 1
 Jemo 3
 Repi
 SOS Children's Village Addis Ababa

Admin Level: 11
 Besrat Gebriel
 EECMY Residential Area 
 Great Akaki
 Gulele Bota
 Haile Garment
 Hana
 Harbu Shet 
 Irtu Bota
 Jemo
 Lafto
 Lebu
 Lebu Mebrathail
 Mekanisa
 Mekanisa Abo
 Menisa
 Vatican

References

External links

Districts of Addis Ababa